Th' Faith Healers were an English indie rock band who were originally active between 1990 and 1994. The members of the group were Roxanne Stephen (vocals), Tom Cullinan (guitar and vocals), Ben Hopkin (bass), and Joe Dilworth (drums). They recorded multiple EPs and singles along with two full LPs.

Tom Cullinan, who handled the bulk of the songwriting, went on to help form the band Quickspace. Signed to Too Pure in the United Kingdom, their albums were released by Elektra in the United States. Both albums feature clear krautrock influences, most evident in their cover of Can's "Mother Sky", from Lido.

Since their initial break-up in 1994, the band have reformed intermittently. They embarked on a short reunion tour in 2006 in conjunction with the release of their compilation Peel Sessions the previous year. The band reformed in 2009, playing at the All Tomorrow's Parties music festival twice, first in May (curated by The Breeders) and then again in December (curated by My Bloody Valentine).

Discography

Studio albums
Lido (1992, Too Pure) 
Imaginary Friend (1993, Too Pure)

Compilations
Too Pure – The Peel Sessions (1992, Too Pure; compilation with PJ Harvey and Stereolab)
L''' (1992, Too Pure; a collection of tracks from the first three EPs)Peel Sessions (2005, Ba Da Bing)

EPsA Picture of Health (1991, Too Pure)In Love (1991, Too Pure)Mr Litnanski'' (1992, Too Pure)

References

External links

English indie rock groups
People from Hampstead
Musical groups established in 1990
Musical groups disestablished in 1994
Musical groups from London